Camanche is a city in Clinton County, Iowa, United States, on the Mississippi River. The population was 4,570 at the time of the 2020 census.

History
A post office has been in operation in Camanche since 1837. The community was named after the Comanche Indian tribe.

1860 tornado
On Sunday, June 3, 1860, a tornado struck Camanche. Few buildings were left standing, and all structures were badly damaged. The storm moved at 50 mph. The lack of an organized way to report weather events left people living along the Mississippi River vulnerable. A raft carrying 26 men was hit outside Camanche, and only three on board survived. The tornado killed a total of 92 people, including at least 41 in Camanche. The outbreak as a whole killed more than 140 people in just a few hours and injured over 300.

Geography
Camanche is located at  (41.786470, -90.259898).

Demographics

2010 census
As of the census of 2010, there were 4,448 people, 1,918 households, and 1,249 families residing in the city. The racial makeup of the city was 97.6% White, 0.6% African American, 0.2% Native American, 0.4% Asian, 0.3% from other races, and 0.8% from two or more races. Hispanic or Latino of any race were 2.1% of the population.

There were 1,918 households, of which 28.5% had children under the age of 18 living with them, 52.9% were married couples living together, 8.3% had a female householder with no husband present, 4.0% had a male householder with no wife present, and 34.9% were non-families. 29.9% of all households were made up of individuals, and 12.7% had someone living alone who was 65 years of age or older. The average household size was 2.32 and the average family size was 2.86.

The median age in the city was 43.7 years. 22.6% of residents were under the age of 18; 6.4% were between the ages of 18 and 24; 22.9% were from 25 to 44; 30.6% were from 45 to 64; and 17.6% were 65 years of age or older. The gender makeup of the city was 49.4% male and 50.6% female.

2000 census
As of the census of 2000, there were 4,215 people, 1,781 households, and 1,241 families residing in the city. The racial makeup of the city was 97.96% White, 0.55% African American, 0.21% Native American, 0.21% Asian, 0.02% Pacific Islander, 0.21% from other races, and 0.83% from two or more races. Hispanic or Latino of any race were 0.69% of the population.

There were 1,781 households, out of which 28.7% had children under the age of 18 living with them, 57.6% were married couples living together, 9.3% had a female householder with no husband present, and 30.3% were non-families. 26.4% of all households were made up of individuals, and 10.1% had someone living alone who was 65 years of age or older. The average household size was 2.37 and the average family size was 2.85.

22.9% are under the age of 18, 7.9% from 18 to 24, 26.5% from 25 to 44, 28.7% from 45 to 64, and 14.0% who were 65 years of age or older. The median age was 40 years. For every 100 females, there were 97.1 males. For every 100 females age 18 and over, there were 93.5 males.

The median income for a household in the city was $49,575, and the median income for a family was $58,583. Males had a median income of $42,324 versus $22,904 for females. The per capita income for the city was $23,456. About 4.3% of families and 5.2% of the population were below the poverty line, including 3.0% of those under age 18 and 6.3% of those age 65 or over.

Education
Camanche High School is located in Camanche, along with Camanche Middle School and Camanche Elementary School.

Notable people

Terry Bradshaw, four-time Super Bowl champion (lived in the town as a child)
George Winans, member of the Wisconsin State Assembly

References

External links

 
City of Camanche
Camanche Community School District Website

Cities in Iowa
Iowa populated places on the Mississippi River
Cities in Clinton County, Iowa
1837 establishments in Wisconsin Territory